AmiExpress - also known as /X - by Synthetic Technologies was a popular BBS software application for the Commodore Amiga line of computers. AmiExpress was extremely popular among the warez scene for trading (exchanging) software.

AmiExpress was created and updated between 1992 and 1995. The software was originally written by Michael Thomas of Synthetic Technologies and later sold to Joseph Hodge of Lightspeed Technologies. Mike Thomas worked on AmiExpress for about two years, modelling the software after the commercial PC BBS software PCBoard. He first ran a BBS on PCBoard on a PC himself, but he was not happy with the PC platform in general and decided to make a comparable product on the Amiga.

A Usenet post (by /X author Joseph Hodge) later stated that both programming on /X and the developer company (LightSpeed Technologies Inc.) were to be dissolved, with plans for a new bulletin board system - Millennium BBS. This never surfaced.

In 2018 AmiExpress was revived by Darren Coles. He obtained permission from Joseph Hodge to continue development of the product and to continue using the name AmiExpress. Version 5.0.0 was released publicly at the end of 2018. This version was re-written in Amiga-E by taking the publicly released source code for v3 and reverse engineering the new functionality present in v4.20. It is highly backwards compatible with the v4.x versions and adds many new features and the source code is available on github.

See also

Warez
Bulletin Board System

References

External links
AmiExpress information and live demonstration
Lightspeed Technologies AmiExpress Professional 4.0 software & source code download

Bulletin board system software
Amiga software